Joseph Wedig (born April 26, 1826 in Hildesheim, Germany), was a member of the Wisconsin State Assembly. He moved to Sheboygan, Wisconsin, USA, in 1849.

Career
Wedig was a member of the Assembly three times, in 1865, from 1867 to 1868, and from 1875 to 1877. He was also an alderman and City Attorney of Sheboygan and a justice of the peace. He was a member of the Reform Party.

References

People from Hildesheim
Hanoverian emigrants to the United States
Politicians from Sheboygan, Wisconsin
Members of the Wisconsin State Assembly
Wisconsin city council members
Wisconsin lawyers
American justices of the peace
Wisconsin Reformers (19th century)
19th-century American politicians
1826 births
Year of death missing